Saint-Didier-en-Velay (literally Saint-Didier in Velay) is a commune in the Haute-Loire department in south-central France.

Population

Sights
In the church of Saint Didier, there is an impressive Spanish Baroque painting of Mary Magdalene which has been attributed to Murillo or Zurbarán. It is most likely a 17th century copy of a painting by Murillo.

Personalities
 Claude-Jean Allouez
 Jean-Baptiste Bouchardon (1667–1742), sculptor and architect

See also
Communes of the Haute-Loire department

References

Communes of Haute-Loire